XETIA-FM is a radio station on 97.9 FM in Guadalajara. The station is owned by Unidifusión and is known as Fórmula Melódica with a romantic format.

History
XETIA-FM received its first concession on June 24, 1968. It was owned by Radio Sinfonia, S.A., along with XETIA-AM 1310 (which remains co-owned). Originally assigned 97.3 MHz, as station spacing needed to be changed, it moved to 97.9 in the 1970s.

The current concessionaire took control in 2000.

Booster
This repeater operates with 81 watts ERP.

References

Mexican radio stations with expired concessions
Radio stations in Guadalajara
Radio stations established in 1968